Sultan Olol Dinle (died 1960s) was a Somali sultan who ruled Kelafo as the head of the Ajuran clan. He successively offered allegiance to the Kingdom of Italy in the 1920s and was named "Sultan of Sciavelli (Shabelle)" in the early 1930s.

Olol Dinle had carved a new sultanate out of the upper reaches of the Webi Shabelle, centered at Kelafo, the traditional capital at the turn of the 20th century. He successively offered allegiance to the Kingdom of Italy in the 1920s and was named "Sultan of Sciavelli (Shabelle)" in the early 1930s.

Background

The Ajuran clan, under the Gareen Dynasty, had once ruled a powerful Imamate in the Somali region of Ethiopia centered at Kelafo. Following peace agreements between Ethiopia and Italy in 1896, Ethiopia was granted territory inhabited by Somalis.

The Gareen empire had collapsed during the 17th century, and a slow decline had set in over the centuries, which led to the eventual demise of the Ajuran state during the 18th century and the end of strong central leadership amongst the Ajuran. Ajuran tribes lived and still live throughout Somali inhabited lands in Ethiopia, Somalia, and Kenya.

Olol Dinle and his sultanate became embroiled in the politics of the day and aligned himself with the Italian colonial authorities. In 1915, Sultan Olol Dinle of Kelafo, Sultan Ali Yusuf Kenadid of Hobyo, and the Italian Somaliland government attempted to dislodge Dervish forces, who had conquered territory bordering the Ogaden in their rapid advance southwards.

Conflict with Ethiopia

The expansion of Abyssinian control deep into the Ogaden during the 1920s led to the capture of Kelafo, leaving Olol Dinle with a very small patch of territory on the Ethiopian side of the border between Ferfer and Kelafo. This tiny patch of land along the Shabelle River was strategically critical, however, as any invasion of Ethiopia from central or southern Somaliland would have to go through this area. Sultan Orfa was placed in control of Kelafo, but Olol Dinle's attacks against Ethiopian forces were so serious that Ethiopian government intervention was required to avoid famine along the Shabelle.

In recognition of Italy's alliance with Olol Dinle, he was dubbed the "Sultan of the Sciaveli (Shabelle) and the Auia (Hawiye)" in the 1930s. Olol Dinle was only too happy to receive Italian aid against Ethiopia, as his father remained in an Ethiopian prison and the Ethiopian flag flew above his people's ancestral capital of Kelafo.

Ethiopia took to supporting Omar Samatar's raids into Italian Somaliland, the former general of the Sultanate of Hobyo seeking a similar goal as that of Olol Dinle in that he sought to reinstate Majerteen clan rule in Hobyo.

In 1931, the Dejazmach ("Commander of the Gate") of Harar, Gebremariam, to whom the Ogaden had been assigned, attacked and destroyed Olol Dinle's fortress at Mustahil and menaced the Italian Rezidenza at Beledweyne, though Gebremariam avoided armed confrontation and withdrew.

To prevent further raids by Olol Dinle, a large force under Balambaras ("Commander of the Fortress") Afawarq Walda Samayat was deployed in Kelafo from Jigjiga in 1933, as Olol Dinle's forces of roughly a thousand Dubat cavalry had grown to pose a serious threat to Ethiopian control of the Shabelle River area.

During the Second Italo-Abyssinian War, Olol Dinle's forces along with the Italians under then-Colonel Luigi Frusci invaded Ethiopia from Hiraan, and attacked the forces of Dejazmach Beine Merid (also spelled Beyene Merid) at Goba.

Forces loyal to Sultan Olol Dinle pushed 350 kilometers inside Ethiopia, attacking the forces of Dejach Beyene Merid at Goba, and destroying all the villages supporting the Ethiopian government.
In the Battle of Ganale Doria Forces loyal to Sultan Olol Dinle clashed with the forces of Ras Desta's Army of Bale and Dejazmach Beine Merid both sides eventually withdrew from the battlefield, with Beine Merid seriously wounded. Its commander-stricken, the army of the Bale retreated, leaving the army of the Sidamo on its own.

Death 
Sultan Olol Dinle was apparently executed during the early 1960s in Addis Ababa. However, oral history suggests he died in 1978.

See also
 Second Italo-Abyssinian War

References 

Ethnic Somali people
Somali monarchs
1960s deaths
Year of death uncertain
Year of birth missing
20th-century Somalian people